Jimmy Ryan is a mandolin player associated with Hi-n-Dry records and the band Morphine.  He was one of the founding members of the band Blood Oranges.

References

External links
Jimmy Ryan website

Discography

with The Blood Oranges:
Corn River (1990)
Lone Green Valley (1992)
The Crying Tree (1993)
"Gathering Flowers for the Master's Bouquet" on "The Slaughter Rule" soundtrack (2003)

with The Beacon Hillbillies:
Duffield Station (1992)
More Songs Of Love And Murder (1994)
Better Place (1996)

with Wooden Leg:
Wooden Leg (1996)

Jimmy Ryan (solo):
Lost Diamond Angel (2002)
Gospel Shirt (2005)
Fun with Music (2007)
Mandolin (2009)
Readville (2013)

Year of birth missing (living people)
Living people
American mandolinists